Below is a list of delayed-blowback firearms.

Lever delayed blowback

Roller delayed blowback

Gas delayed blowback

Flywheel delayed blowback

Hesitation lock

Radial delayed blowback

Toggle delayed blowback

Vector delayed blowback

References

Firearm actions
delayed blowback